Henri van Wermeskerken (22 March 1882 – 7 June 1937) was a Dutch writer. His work was part of the literature event in the art competition at the 1928 Summer Olympics.

References

1882 births
1937 deaths
20th-century Dutch male writers
Olympic competitors in art competitions
Writers from Rotterdam